Andrew Scott "Andy" Haydon (born 1933) is a Canadian engineer and former politician. He was reeve of Nepean Township, Ontario from 1970 to 1978 and Regional Chair of Ottawa-Carleton from 1978-1991. Haydon was the first mayor of the city of Nepean when it incorporated on November 24, 1978; Ben Franklin assumed the title one week later.

Early life
Born in Toronto, Ontario, Canada, Haydon came to Ottawa, Ontario when he was six. He attended Queen's University in Kingston, Ontario where he received a degree in chemical engineering. He then worked in Cornwall, Ontario as a professional engineer. He moved to Nepean Township in 1961.

Political career
Haydon was elected in 1966 to the Nepean Township council, after it was expanded to five aldermen from three. In 1969, he was elected reeve of Nepean. He defeated the incumbent reeve D. Aubrey Moodie in a landslide with 66% of the vote, thanks to the new subdivisions in the city unhappy with Moodie's tax increase. The Nepean Sportsplex and National Capital Equestrian Park were built during Haydon's term as reeve.

In 1978 he became the regional chair of Ottawa-Carleton, where he served for 13 years, helping to introduce Ottawa's Transitway, Ottawa City Hall (then the Regional Offices), and the Robert O. Pickard Environmental Centre. He failed however in his plans to establish a second Greenbelt in the city as well as his dreams of establishing Ottawa as a federal capital district.

After retiring from politics, he ran a bed and breakfast with his wife.

Attempted comeback in politics
In September 2006, Haydon unexpectedly announced his candidacy in the new suburban ward of Gloucester-South Nepean, 15 years after his retirement from politics. He was defeated by Steve Desroches in the 2006 municipal elections.

In September 2010, Haydon announced his candidacy for Mayor of Ottawa, about one month before the date of the election. He finished fourth with 18,914 votes, or 7% of the total ballots.

Haydon has four children with his deceased wife, Mary Leishman. He is currently married to Sherry Franklin, the widow of Ben Franklin, Haydon's successor as mayor of Nepean.

Honours
Andrew Haydon Park on the Ottawa River and Andrew Haydon Hall, the city council chambers at Ottawa City Hall, were named after him. Carleton University offers a scholarship in his name each year to a student in an engineering program.

References

External links 

 Haydon's blog: https://web.archive.org/web/20120308213731/http://www.andyhaydon.com/

Living people
Mayors and reeves of Nepean
Chairs of the Regional Municipality of Ottawa-Carleton
1933 births
Queen's University at Kingston alumni
People from Cornwall, Ontario
Politicians from Toronto
Canadian hoteliers